Ibrahim El Boustati (born 1 October 1995) is a Dutch-Moroccan kickboxer competing as a cruiserweight and heavyweight in Enfusion and has spent his whole career fighting under their banner. He has held titles in three different weight classes in the organization, twice at 187 lbs, and once in the 198 lbs and 209 lbs categories.

He has throughout his career been ranked as one of the best kickboxers in the world.

Personal life
Ibrahim played football as a child. He began training kickboxing aged ten, after his brother invited him to a kickboxing gym.

He works as an investigative officer with the Nederlandse Spoorwegen.

Kickboxing career
El Boustati made his debut in 2014 with Enfusion, aged 18, when he faced Ali Sabab. He won by TKO, after the ringside doctor stopped the fight.

After his debut, Ibrahim won his next six fights, earning a chance to fight for the Enfusion 85 kg title. He won the fight by knockout, winning his first career title.

He went on another winning streak, winning his next five fights, two by TKO. He would once again fight for the 85 kg title, when he faced Mirco Cingel. He won the fight by unanimous decision.

Afterwards, he beat Filip Verlinden. He then fought against Andrew Tate for the 90 kg title. He won the fight by knockout.

El Boustati lost to Ulrik Bokeme in his next fight, before winning a unanimous decision against Filip Verlinden to win the 95 kg title.

His next five fights would be the worst stretch of his career, losing three of his next five, all by knockout.

El Boustati was scheduled to fight Francis Goma at -95 kg during Enfusion 97.

Championships and accomplishments

Kickboxing
Enfusion
Enfusion –85 kg World Championship (–187 lb) 
One successful title defense
Enfusion –90 kg World Championship (–198 lb)
Enfusion –95 kg World Championship (–209 lb)

Kickboxing record

|-  bgcolor="#FFBBBB"
| 2020-02-29|| Loss||align=left| Ziad Mouhout || Enfusion 96 || Eindhoven, Netherlands || Knockout || 1 || 3:00|| 18-5
|-  bgcolor="#CCFFCC"
| 2019-11-2|| Win||align=left| Mustapha El Barbari || Enfusion Talents 76  || Antwerp, Belgium || Knockout || 2 || 3:00|| 18-4
|-  bgcolor="#FFBBBB"
| 2018-05-05|| Loss||align=left| Lorenzo Javier Jorge || Enfusion || Antwerp, Belgium || Knockout || 1 || 3:00|| 17-4
|-  bgcolor="#FFBBBB"
| 2017-11-18|| Loss||align=left| Ulrik Bokeme || Glorious Heroes Presents Enfusion League || Groningen, Netherlands || Knockout || 1 || 3:00|| 17-3
|-  bgcolor="#CCFFCC"
| 2017-09-16|| Win||align=left| Mauricio Costa Cardoso || Enfusion Live || Zwolle, Netherlands || Knockout || 3 || 3:00|| 17-2
|-
|-  bgcolor="#CCFFCC"
| 2017-04-29|| Win||align=left| Filip Verlinden || Fightsense presents Enfusion Live || Zoetermeer, Netherlands || Decision (Unanimous) || 3 || 3:00|| 16-2
|-
! style=background:white colspan=9 |
|- 
|-  bgcolor="#FFBBBB"
| 2017-02-18|| Loss||align=left| Ulrik Bokeme ||Enfusion 56 || Eindhoven, Netherlands || Knockout || 1 || 3:00|| 15-2
|-  bgcolor="#CCFFCC"
| 2016-12-13|| Win||align=left| Andrew Tate ||Enfusion 44 || The Hague, Netherlands || Knockout || 1 || 3:00|| 15-1
|-
! style=background:white colspan=9 |
|- 
|-  bgcolor="#FFBBBB"
| 2016-09-17|| Loss ||align=left| Filip Verlinden ||Enfusion 41 || Antwerp, Belgium|| Decision (overturned) || 3 || 3:00|| 14-1
|-  bgcolor="#CCFFCC"
| 2016-04-02|| Win||align=left| Mirco Cingel ||Enfusion 28 || The Hague, Netherlands || Decision (Unanimous) || 3 || 3:00|| 14-0
|-
! style=background:white colspan=9 |
|- 
|-  bgcolor="#CCFFCC"
| 2016-02-27|| Win||align=left| Patrick Van Rees ||Enfusion 38 || Eindhoven, Netherlands || Knockout || 3 || 3:00|| 13-0
|-  bgcolor="#CCFFCC"
| 2016-01-23|| Win||align=left| Ertugrul Bayrak ||Sportmani Events VIII || Amsterdam, Netherlands || Decision (Unanimous) || 3 || 3:00|| 12-0
|-  bgcolor="#CCFFCC"
| 2015-11-28|| Win||align=left| Samir Boukhidous ||Fightsense || The Hague, Netherlands || Disqualification || 2 || 3:00|| 11-0
|-  bgcolor="#CCFFCC"
| 2015-09-19|| Win||align=left| Karoucha Ahmed ||Enfusion || Benahavís, Spain || Decision (Unanimous) || 3 || 3:00|| 10-0
|-  bgcolor="#CCFFCC"
| 2015-05-23|| Win||align=left| Clyde Brunswijk ||Superkombat World Grand Prix Series || Bucharest, Romania || Decision (Unanimous) || 3 || 3:00|| 9-0
|-  bgcolor="#CCFFCC"
| 2015-04-25|| Win||align=left| Tomas Senkyr ||Gala Night Thaiboxing || Žilina, Slovakia || Knockout || 2 || 3:00|| 8-0
|-
! style=background:white colspan=9 |
|- 
|-  bgcolor="#CCFFCC"
| 2015-04-04|| Win||align=left| Iwan Pang ||Enfusion Talents 8 || La Haye, Netherlands || Knockout || 2 || 3:00|| 7-0
|-  bgcolor="#CCFFCC"
| 2015-03-07|| Win||align=left| Mohamed Tahtari ||Fight League - The Beginning || Hoofddorp, Netherlands || Decision (Unanimous) || 3 || 3:00|| 6-0
|-  bgcolor="#CCFFCC"
| 2014-12-21|| Win||align=left| Khalid El Bakouri ||Enfusion 23 || Pica Mare, Netherlands || Decision (Unanimous) || 3 || 3:00|| 5-0
|-  bgcolor="#CCFFCC"
| 2014-11-29|| Win||align=left| Rushad Moradi ||Fightsense VI || The Hague, Netherlands || Decision (Unanimous) || 3 || 3:00|| 4-0
|-  bgcolor="#CCFFCC"
| 2014-06-07|| Win||align=left| Boubaker El Bakouri ||Fightsense || The Hague, Netherlands || Decision (Unanimous) || 3 || 3:00|| 3-0
|-  bgcolor="#CCFFCC"
| 2014-04-05|| Win||align=left| Rick Van De Heuvel ||Fightsense || The Hague, Netherlands || Knockout || 3 || 3:00|| 2-0
|-  bgcolor="#CCFFCC"
| 2014-02-22|| Win||align=left| Ali Sabab ||Enfusion Sportmani Events V || Amsterdam, Netherlands || Knockout || 1 || 3:00|| 1-0
|-
|-
| colspan=9 | Legend:

See also
List of male kickboxers

References

1995 births
Living people
Dutch male kickboxers
Dutch sportspeople of Moroccan descent
Moroccan male kickboxers
Heavyweight kickboxers